STREIT Group is an armoured vehicle manufacturer, based in Ras Al Khaimah, United Arab Emirates. As of 2019, Streit maintains "12 state-of-the-art production facilities and 25 offices worldwide", employing "a workforce of more than 2,000 people".

Streit produces Armored Personnel Carriers, Cash-in-Transit, Luxury, and Security vehicles which are designed to provide effective protection in high-risk situations. Streit's vehicles undergo STANAG 3 certification for military tactical vehicles and VPAM BRV 2009 VR7 for luxury and special purpose vehicles.

History

The group was founded in 1992 by Guerman Goutorov.

In September 2015, STREIT USA was fined $3.5m for illegal export of armored vehicles to Afghanistan, Iraq, Nigeria and some other countries without required licenses from Commerce Department.

In a newspaper report published in 2016, the RCMP said that it was investigating the Canadian subsidiary over possible sanctions violations in the Sudan, in its sale of 30 Typhoon armoured trucks.

In July 2019, STREIT vehicles had been seen in the Sudan, and Canadian activists were concerned about their use in the War in Darfur.

In Eurosatory 2022, STREIT announced that a manufacturing facility is being set up in Uganda.

Leadership
In July 2019, "Canadian businessman" Guerman Goutorov was identified as the company's CEO.

Unpaid Salaries and Protests 
Beginning 4th Quarter of 2014, A large number of  employees  reported non-payment of salaries for as long as 8 months, mostly from STREIT Canada and STREIT Middle East. In early 2015, a number of protests were carried out by workers at STREIT Middle East for non-payment of wages.

Vehicles

Streit design
 STREIT Group Cougar based on Toyota Land Cruiser 79 chassis
 STREIT Group Spartan based on the Ford F-550 chassis
 STREIT Group Typhoon, 4x4 or 6x6 MRAP

KrAZ built armoured vehicles
The following armoured vehicles are either built under license or are built with Streit assistance:
 KrAZ Spartan (Спартан) - 4×4, based on Ford F550
 KrAZ Cougar (Кугар)[21] - 4×4, based on Toyota Land Cruiser 79
 KrAZ-ASV Panther (Пантер) - MRAP based on KrAZ-5233 or KrAZ-6322
 KrAZ-MPV Shrek One (Шрек) - MRAP based on KrAZ-5233
 KrAZ Feona (Фіона) - 6×6 MRAP based on KrAZ-6322
 KrAZ-6322 Raptor (Раптор) - 6×6
 KrAZ Hurricane (Ураган) - 8×8 MRAP based on KrAZ H27.3 (KrAZ-7634)
 KrAZ Convoy (Конвой) - 4×4/6×6/8×8 armored chassis cab/flatbed

Global subsidiaries or licensees
 STREIT Manufacturing (Canada)
 STREIT Pakistan
 KrAZ (Ukraine)
 NEC–Streit Uganda Limited

References

External links
 Official page

Military vehicle manufacturers
Armoured cars
Defence companies of the United Arab Emirates
Defence companies of Canada